Horace Reid may refer to:

 Horace Reid (cricketer) (born 1935), Jamaican cricketer of the 1960s.
 Horace Reid (tennis) (born 1955), American tennis player of the 1970s.